Elections in the Roman Republic were an essential part of its governance, with participation only being afforded to Roman citizens. Upper-class interests, centered in the urban political environment of cities, often trumped the concerns of the diverse and disunified lower class; while at times, the people already in power would pre-select candidates for office, further reducing the value of voters’ input. The candidates themselves at first remained distant from voters and refrained from public presentations (in fact, formal speech-making was at one point forbidden in an effort to focus on the policies rather than the charisma of the candidate), but they later more than made up for time lost with habitual bribery, coercion, and empty promises. As the practice of electoral campaigning grew in use and extent, the pool of candidates was no longer limited to a select group with riches and high birth. Instead, many more ordinary citizens had a chance to run for office, allowing for more equal representation in key government decisions.

During the Roman Republic the citizens would elect almost all officeholders annually. Popular elections for high office were largely undermined and then brought to an end by Augustus (r. 27 BCE – 14 CE), the first Roman emperor (earlier known as Octavian). However, Roman elections continued at the local level.

Sources
Elections were a central element to the history and politics of Rome for some 500 years, and the major historians such as Livy and Plutarch make frequent references to them. No comprehensive account exists on how elections worked. Historians have reconstructed details from scattered accounts from different eras, but much is still uncertain and there is scholarly debate over several elements.

One of the main schematic sources on the Roman constitution is Polybius, who created the influential description of Rome as having a "mixed" constitution with monarchial, artistocratic, and popular elements from the consuls, Senate, and popular assemblies. This approach, however, is largely a priori and unsatisfactorily forces elements of the Roman constitution into Greek-inspired constitutional schema.

Sallust gives a valuable account of Marius' campaign of 107 BC in the Jugurthine War.  The most important sources are writings by Cicero. While his major works touch on elections, his daily life was immersed in late Republican politics, and his surviving letters and orations are the most valuable. Two important ones are Pro Murena and Pro Plancio, both legal speeches to defend candidates accused of bribery. He also wrote two dialogues on the republic and the laws (De re publica and De Legibus) which provide further schematic context for Roman political thought.

The most comprehensive surviving source on the elections themselves is the Commentariolum Petitionis (Little Handbook on Electioneering) by Quintus Tullius Cicero. It is a how-to guide on running for consul, written by Quintus for his brother's campaign in 64 BC. Unfortunately, there are many doubts as to its authenticity, accepted by some as authentic to the period, others date it a century later to an author who would not have direct knowledge of election realities.

Structure

The Roman people were theoretically sovereign, but all of its sovereign power had to be exercised through the magistrates which it elected. The Latin vocabulary for elections and voting implies early voting was largely done by acclamation, where the purpose of elections was to affirm popular consent for elite leadership choices. At the beginning of the Republic, the only elected positions were the two consuls; over the course of the Republic new public offices were added, and by the end of the Republic, some forty-four public offices were elected. All were elected annually to one-year terms except the censor, who was normally elected every five years. The only public offices which were not elected were that of dictator and magister equitum, the dictator's deputy, who were appointed by the consul in extraordinary circumstances.

Roman citizens were divided into various assemblies which were distinguished by their form of block votes. The assemblies abstractly represented the whole Roman people, even if the blocks had little relation to population or participation. The citizens were divided into curiae, centuries, and tribes, which when organised created assemblies with curiate, centuriate, and tribal forms. By the late republic, the comitia curiata – the body which ratified imperium – was largely ceremonial, where the thirty curiae were represented by thirty lictors standing in for the entire Roman population. Actual selection of the higher magistrates (consul, praetor, and censor) was done before the centuries. This was a timocratic assembly descended from the organisation of the early Roman Army, and the centuries were organized into tiers by rank and property with cavalry equites at the top and unarmed and unpropertied at the bottom. Quaestors, and curule aediles were elected by tribes, while tribunes and plebeian aediles were elected by the plebeian council. These were divided into thirty-five tribes, which were hereditary and geographic. The plebeian council was called with the plebs divided into tribes, making it almost identical to the tribal assembly.

Process 

After a magistrate constituted an assembly, usually in summer or early autumn, candidates would stand before the electorate. When voting started, the appropriate block would lodge votes before a magistrate. Prior to 139 BC and the passage of the lex Gabinia tabellaria, a voter would queue on raised gangway and then state to a clerk his ballot. After the reforms of that year, he would instead write names in his own hand. The ballots would then be collected in an urn and counted.

In the centuries, the results of each century's vote was announced as they became available. The first to vote was the centuria praerogativa, selected from the seventy centuries of the first class; after it voted and its result was announced, the rest of the first class voted and their results announced. Following the first class, the equites and patricians voted, then the remaining classes in order. Voting ended when the requisite number of posts was filled. In the tribes, after 139 BC, the voting was likely simultaneous, but tallied in an order determined by lot, with results ending also when all posts were filled. 

Elections for both the tribes and centuries normally occurred in the Campus Martius; while the assemblies met elsewhere also for legislative purposes, the larger space on the campus may have been needed to fit the higher number of voters. Through the republican period, voting occurred only in person: only when elections became irrelevant in the early Principate were provisions made for ballots from Italian towns to be transmitted under seal to Rome.

After the assembly voted, their decision had to be ratified by the presiding magistrate. If the magistrate did not so ratify, the election was invalid. Formally, the election of a new magistrate was done by the magistrate on advice from the people, with the succeeding magistrate "created" by the incumbent. In earlier times, elections may have merely been acclamatory votes to approve leaders already presented by the presiding magistrate. Presiding magistrates had the power to and did throw out votes: in 215 BC the presiding consul requested the centuria praerogativa to reconsider its vote; in 184 BC, Quintus Fulvius Flaccus' election as praetor was thrown out because he had already been elected aedile; in 148 BC, the presiding magistrate refused to recognise the election of Scipio Aemilianus as consul because he was then a candidate only for the aedileship. For a magistrate to override the will of the people like this, however, required some degree of support; if candidates protested and support was not forthcoming, the president usually gave way.

After elections, a meeting of the comitia curiata – by the late republic, the thirty curiae were each represented by a single lictor, – was called to grant the new magistrate imperium or otherwise the auspices needed to have imperium. Even in the late republic, having the requisite lex curiata de imperio was considered necessary for a magistrate to hold provincial command.

Campaigning
A campaign would begin when the election day was announced by the magistrate in charge of elections. In 98 BC the lex Caecilia Didia set the campaign length between 17 and 25 days.

A core campaign activity was canvassing in the Forum. The candidate would walk to the forum surrounded by a group of supporters, to meet another cluster of allies in the Forum. At the forum, the candidate would shake hands with the eligible voters. Whispering into the ear of some candidates would be a nomenclator, a slave who had been trained to memorize the names of all the voters, so that the candidate could greet them all by name. The person running for office would wear an especially whitened toga, known as the toga candida. It is from this term that we get the modern word candidate. Some candidates may have extended their canvassing to the rural markets around Rome, once those outside the city were allowed to vote.

Political rallies were not permitted in Roman elections. To attract voters candidates instead held banquets and gave away free tickets to the games. To pay for these either a candidate had to be wealthy, or rely on the sponsorship of wealthy friends. There are cases of people going ruinously into debt to fund their campaigns.  There were no attempts to restrict who could donate or how much, but there were several laws passed attempting to limit candidate spending on banquets and games.

Declaring candidacy 
Public voting in Rome was originally a process that did not allow for a true choice from the people. After the Senate prepared a list of candidates, it was the magistrate that narrowed the list to the two candidates that could contend for the nomination. Later on in the Roman Republic a practice called professio was established, in which potential candidates started to “profess to the magistrate” their wish to be nominated for candidacy. This led to the nominated candidates publicly advertising their aspirations to office and even “[conducting] their own canvass,” clearly campaigning with the idea of voters’ choice in mind. Still, the people’s power could be limited, as there were a few instances in 201 BC and 169 BC when candidates suspiciously became elected just a day after they declared themselves a candidate, which would of course allow no real time for the people to be aware of, much less vote for, such last-minute choices. In the later century, however, more concrete rules were established regarding the behavior and canvassing of candidates. These laws kept people from declaring candidacy the day before an election, requiring the profession to be made before a certain set date.

Campaigning strategies 
Politicians running for a position of power in the Roman Republic followed campaigning strategies similar to those used by modern politicians. In a contemporary letter written to consul candidate Marcus Cicero by his brother, Quintus, during Marcus’ campaign, Quintus wrote on the various campaigning strategies that would help Marcus be elected. One of the most important tips Quintus emphasized was that Marcus should create friendships with men of higher status because these were the men that had the most influence. In addition to creating relationships with the wealthy, Quintus also advised Marcus to “remind everyone in your debt that they should repay you with their support.” To have a chance to be elected, politicians needed to recall any favors owed to them because they needed all the support they could receive. Furthermore, in a similar fashion to modern politics, politicians in the Roman Republic needed to please everyone, whether that meant making promises they knew they could not keep or simply being very polite. In Marcus’s response to his brother, he noted that “people would prefer you give them a gracious lie than an outright refusal.”

Thus, all that mattered was that the politician kept everyone happy, even if that meant lying to their supporters. In addition to flattery and favor-trading, politicians would even resort to ad hominem tactics; in particular, one can find inscribed on the toilets of public buildings in Pompeii numerous attacks on the character or constituency of opponents running for office. Some clever candidates (or their supporters) apparently scrawled derisive messages implying that only unsavory characters such as “the sneak thieves... the whole company of late drinkers [and] late risers” supported the opposing candidate.

Programmes and parties 
Roman elections were not like modern elections. The people's role was to choose the candidate with the finest qualities and highest merit. Magistrates were supposed to exercise their powers independently and impartially for the community as a whole, rather than for the benefit of factional interests. This meant that candidates did not campaign on the basis of policies, programmes, or policies. While some scholars believe that there was a division in the late republic between optimates and populares, these were not political parties and candidates did not stand to represent them.

Corruption

Since most voters saw elections as irrelevant to their own lives, many candidates resorted to bribery to convince the people to cast their votes. Bribery became such a commonplace practice in the later Republic that it was seen as a normal part of the political process, and ranged anywhere from the blatant promising of money to simply hosting games and entertaining the people. Sometime during the mid-second century, Polybius noted the prohibition of bribery, but this proved to be useless as it continued to be prominent in elections and was very difficult to differentiate between bribery and the patronage system. Some evidence suggests that as the dominance of the practice grew, the number of men who gained the consulship without any consulates in his family grew as well. Political office, then, was no longer restricted to those of noble birth, and the Republic began to transition from an aristocratic government to become more oligarchic in nature. Some sources assert that the money gained from bribes actually helped common voters afford the cost of voting. In fact, the biggest target of this corruption was these poorer citizens, revealing that these voters still had considerable influence in the outcome of elections. However, the consequences of such corruption caused a lack of faith in the constitution and the political process, which led, in part, to civil war.

Corruption posed the greatest problem in the later Republic when the lucrative benefits of high office led to more competitive elections. Candidates were frequently accused of breaking the laws restricting spending, and also of directly bribing voters. Electoral crimes were known as ambitus, and there was a long series of laws passed trying to eliminate it, seemingly to little effect. In the consular election of 59 BC, both Julius Caesar and his rival Bibulus committed to large bribes. In the election of 54 BC two candidates promised the vast sum of the 10 million sesterces to the centuria praerogativa for its vote.

Representation and electorate
The Tribal Council on its surface was equitable, for example, but actually worked in favor of elites who had the resources to travel to the city to participate in the election. The Roman system clients and patronage also ensured that votes of the lower classes were tied to an elite. While voting was more open, running for office was much more restricted. Being a candidate had more stringent property tests, and required ten years of military service. Throughout the entire history of the Republic running and winning office was dominated by elite families.

The plebeian group, consisting mostly of rural farmers, gained greater political representation only slowly over time. By the middle of the 5th century BC, the plebeians had gained enough political power that an assembly of them called the Concilium (a consolidation of a number of other disjointed plebeian assemblies) was able to elect ten tribunes, or representatives, annually. The Concilium was notable in that it was the first to represent all plebeians, not just those in the city. It was also one of few assemblies of its time to employ group voting, in which each tribe of plebeians agreed on a single vote to cast, similar to the United States electoral college and some processes of English Parliament. When it came to electing officials and magistrates higher up, though, that responsibility still lay with the Centuriate Assembly, which was for the most part controlled by patrician interests. Eventually, that too changed to include the votes of more than 35 countryside plebeian tribes. Once the lower class had greater political representation, there came a greater opportunity for them to finally ascend the political and social ladder, making the “rule by the people” a more attainable goal.

Electorate and turnout
Voting for most offices was open to all full Roman citizens, a group that excluded women, slaves and originally those living outside of Rome. In the early Republic, the electorate would have been small, but as Rome grew it expanded. The Lex Julia of 90 BC extending voting rights to citizens across Italy greatly expanded the franchise. By the final Republican census of 70 BC, there were 910,000 possible electors.

One unknown is how the Romans kept track of who was eligible to vote. Debates over the franchise were frequent, and differentiating voters from non-voters must have been done. One possibility is that as voters gathered as a tribe the members would be well known enough to each other that an outsider could be spotted, but as populations grew this would have been difficult. Historians have proposed that a central voters list was kept or that citizens were given some form of voter identification, but no sources or archaeological evidence survives for either.

Another debated issue is turnout. No contemporary source indicates how many cast ballots in an election. One clue to an approximate number is the size of the voting area. As consul, Julius Caesar began the construction of a structure on the Campus Martius to hold the population while voting. The size of the structure, if completely filled with voters could have held between 30,000 and 70,000 people. This is almost certainly a high estimate, as open spaces for conducting polling itself would at the least have been required. Cicero mentions in one work that the voting for a single consul in 45 BC took 5 hours, with the equites and the first and second classes voting. From what we know of how the voting was structured historians have estimated that at most between 6,000 and 16,800 could have voted in that election. With an electorate of 910,000, even the most generous guesses put voter turnout below 10%.

End of elections
The reign of Caesar Augustus saw the final decline of democratic elections in Rome. Augustus undermined and lessened the significance of the election results, eventually eliminating elections entirely. He also diminished the importance of the offices themselves - the senate was full of his supporters, so candidacy was based on flattery and not on merit since he could nominate senators freely and essentially controlled all membership. Augustus had extensive influence over the magistrates as well; he was given the power to grant commendation to candidates for office, which became a guarantee of winning the election. He later nullified the power of the elected tribunes by assuming the powers of a tribune without actually holding the office itself, allowing him to act as one without other tribunes challenging him. This included casting down any legislation proposed by the others, significantly decreasing the power of the tribunes. Because of this, even though elections still occurred, the results mattered far less than they had under the Republic. Eventually, late in his principate, Augustus eliminated direct election entirely, establishing designation by a group of senators and equites. Citizens were still allowed to elect municipal officers, but filling higher-level posts was left entirely to those already in power.

There is evidence that elections continued at the municipal level for some time after outside of Rome. The remains of Pompeii found several graffiti inscriptions lauding one candidate or another, indicating that contested elections were still underway there in 79 CE.

Notes

References

External links 
 Campaign Tips From Cicero

Roman
Elections in Europe
Government of the Roman Republic